Living Things is the ninth studio album by alternative rock musician Matthew Sweet. It was released on RCAM Records in 2004.

Release
The album was met with little commercial success, but with favorable reviews. Review aggregating website Metacritic reports a normalized score of 70% based on 9 reviews. Uncut magazine wrote that Living Things was "as ambitious and compelling as psych-tinged pop gets."

Details
The song, "Cats Vs. Dogs", was featured in the film, Garfield: The Movie.

Track listing
All songs written by Matthew Sweet.
 "The Big Cats of Shambala"
 "You're Not Sorry"
 "Dandelion"
 "Push the Feelings"
 "In My Tree"
 "Cats Vs. Dogs"
 "I Saw Red"
 "In My Time"
 "Sunlight"
 "Season is Over"
 "Tomorrow"

Japanese Copy Control CD version was released with two bonus tracks:

"Walk on the Edge (Demo)"
"Season Is Over (Demo)"

Personnel
Matthew Sweet – vocals, guitar, bass, theremin, e-bow, clavioline
Van Dyke Parks – piano, organ, electric harpsichord
Greg Leisz – slide guitar, mandolin
Doug Lacy – steel drums
Tony Marsico – double bass
Ric Menck – drums, percussion
Peter Phillips – guitar
Roger Handy – harmonica

References

2004 albums
Matthew Sweet albums